The RTV-G-4 Bumper was a sounding rocket built by the United States. A combination of the German V-2 rocket and the WAC Corporal sounding rocket, it was used to study problems pertaining to two-stage high-speed rockets. The Bumper program launched eight rockets between May 13, 1948, to July 29, 1950. The first six flights were conducted at the White Sands Missile Range; the seventh launch, Bumper 8 on July 24, 1950, was the first rocket launched from Cape Canaveral.

Bumper program

Background 

The Bumper program to produce and launch a two-stage combination of the V-2 and WAC Corporal rockets was conceived in July 1946 by Colonel Holger N. Toftoy. Both the WAC Corporal and the V-2 had been extensively tested at White Sands Proving Grounds, the WAC Corporal's launch series occurring in late 1945/early 1946 and the V-2 launches beginning March 15, 1946.

Bumper was started on June 20, 1947, to:
 Investigate launching techniques for a two-stage missile and separation of the two stages at high velocity.
 Conduct limited investigation of high-speed high-altitude phenomena.
 Attain record-setting velocities and altitudes.

Bumper employed the V-2 as first stage and the WAC Corporal as second stage. This separation occurred before V-2 Brennschluss (engine cutoff) to ensure that the WAC Corporal had a stable, actively controlled platform to lift off from, and also so that the V-2 would impart close to maximum possible speed to the Bumper's second stage. Together, Bumper could reach altitudes of more than twice those attainable by the V-2 alone.

Engineering and limited scientific results (for instance, air resistance at high altitude determined by the rocket's trajectory) would be obtained from the  telemetry payload carried by the WAC Corporal second stage. Though the Bumper program was not, itself, a secret, aspects of it were classified, particularly the way the WAC Corporal was fitted into the nose of the V-2.

Planning 
Overall responsibility for the Bumper program was given to the General Electric Company and was included in the Hermes project. The Jet Propulsion Laboratory was assigned to perform the theoretical investigations required, design the second stage, and create the basic design of the separation system. The Douglas Aircraft Company was assigned to fabricate the second stage, and do detailed design and fabrication of the special V-2 rocket parts required.

No German engineers were directly involved with Project Bumper, though some worked on the initial studies regarding the mating of the V-2 and WAC corporal. Two women, Mary Taggard and Bea Sylvester, were on the Bumper team providing rocket (but not launch) support.

Operations 
Six Bumper launches were made from White Sands Proving Grounds. The first four, launched in 1947/48 were test flights of varying degrees of success. The first fully successful Bumper flight was the fifth in the series, launched at 3:14 P.M. (MST), February 24, 1949.

Bumper 5 was the first in the Bumper series to be launched with a fully fueled second stage.

The WAC Corporal hit the ground 12 minutes after take-off  from its launch pad. So great was its velocity upon impact, higher than any rocket to date, that the wreck was not found for analysis until January 1950.

In 1949, the Joint Long Range Proving Ground was established at Cape Canaveral Air Force Station on the east coast of Florida, where the last two Bumper launches would take place. On July 24, 1950, Bumper 8 became the inaugural launch of "the Cape", still in use as of 2021. Both Bumpers 8 and 7 (fired in that sequence, a week apart). These flights were much ballyhooed in the American press.

Bumper 8 and 7 saw significant modifications to the WAC Corporal. The nose cone was coated in teflon, while the WAC Corporal body was coated in  perlite to resist heating caused by atmospheric friction. Down range tracking was provided by the USS Sarsfield (DD-837), which was positioned beneath the point where staging was to occur. Bumper 7 suffered the first pad abort at Cape Canaveral causing Bumper 8 to be launched first. Bumper 8 pitched over to an angle only 10 degrees above the horizon instead of the planned 22 degrees. The WAC Corporal nose was observed to fail from the tracking ship USS Sarsfield following second stage separation. There was no telemetry received following the separation and disintegration of the WAC Corporal. Despite the failure of the WAC Corporal the flight was declared a success as the missile range facilities had all functioned as intended. As the WAC Corporal was still highly classified, its failure was not reported. Bumper 7 was launched a week later. Bumper 7's V-2 saw thrust decay while only 14 miles east of the Cape at an altitude of only 8.5 miles. As intended following V-2 thrust decay the WAC Corporal then fired for 40 seconds achieving only 3,286 mph, slightly over half the speed expected. Joint Long Range Proving Ground Commander Col. Harold R. Turner announced that the test was "a complete success in every way." The myth that the Bumper program at the Cape was a success, when in fact there were significant failures of the missiles, has continued to this day.

Launch history

See also 

Spaceflight before 1951

References 

Spaceflight before 1951
United States Army equipment
Experimental rockets of the United States
Sounding rockets of the United States